Josef Labuda (born 13 December 1941) is a Slovak former volleyball player who competed for Czechoslovakia in the 1964 Summer Olympics.

He was born in Bratislava.

In 1964 he was a squad member of the Czechoslovak team which won the silver medal in the Olympic tournament.

External links
 Olympic report 1964
 International Olympic Committee medal database

1941 births
Living people

Czechoslovak men's volleyball players
Olympic volleyball players of Czechoslovakia
Volleyball players at the 1964 Summer Olympics
Olympic silver medalists for Czechoslovakia
Olympic medalists in volleyball
Slovak men's volleyball players
Medalists at the 1964 Summer Olympics
Sportspeople from Bratislava